was a Japanese film production company and video game developer. The company filed for bankruptcy on August 12, 2011.

Games developed
TIZ: Tokyo Insect Zoo (1996, PlayStation)
Project V6 (1998, PlayStation)
Pen Pen TriIcelon (1998, Dreamcast)
Godzilla Generations (1998, Dreamcast)
Alive (1998, PlayStation)
Godzilla Generations: Maximum Impact (1999, Dreamcast)
Love Story (2000, PlayStation 2)
Combat Queen (2002, PlayStation 2)

External links
Official website via Internet Archive
List of General Entertainment video games at GameFAQs

Video game companies disestablished in 2011
Video game companies established in 1994
Video game companies of Japan
Video game development companies
Defunct software companies of Japan